Earthworks is a 1965 dystopian science fiction novel by  British science fiction author Brian Aldiss.

Plot introduction 
The novel is set in a world of environmental catastrophe and extreme socio-economic inequality.  Outside crowded cities controlled by a police state, a class of wealthy and powerful "Farmers" exploit a rural prison labour population and hunt down subversive "Travellers" who have broken free of social controls.

Land Art
In 1967, the artist Robert Smithson took a copy of Earthworks with him on a trip to the Passaic River in New Jersey (where he created The Monuments of Passaic, 1967). He reused the title to describe some of his works, based on natural materials like earth and rocks, and infused with his ideas about entropy and environmental catastrophe.

External links
Earthworks on Brian Aldiss's official site

Footnotes

1965 British novels
British science fiction novels
1965 science fiction novels
Overpopulation fiction
Novels by Brian Aldiss
Faber and Faber books